Wilt: Larger Than Life is a biography of NBA professional basketball player Wilt Chamberlain by journalist Robert Cherry. The 416-page book was published in November 2004 by Triumph Books. The foreword is written by Jerry West, Chamberlain's teammate and friend on the Los Angeles Lakers.

The book chronologically spans the entire life of Wilt Chamberlain, starting with his roots in middle class Philadelphia, highlights his rise to young basketball prodigy in Overbrook high school and at Kansas University, follows his NBA career as member of the Philadelphia / San Francisco Warriors, Philadelphia 76ers and Lakers franchises and his successful business life afterwards up to his death. Cherry also delves into the more colorful aspects of Chamberlain's private life, most prominently his notorious claim to have slept with 20,000 women.

In the final "Acknowledgements" chapter, Cherry gives credit to over 150 interview partners, and acknowledges Chamberlain's lawyer Sy Goldberg, his sister Barbara Lewis (née Chamberlain) his long-time physician Dr Stan Lorber, and close personal friends Lynda Huey, Zelda Spoelstra, Bob Billings as main sources.

As Angelo Cataldi,  host of The Morning Show, 610 WIP, said: "I'm not sure even [Robert Cherry] realizes exactly how superb a job he did at capturing the greatest athlete and my favorite athlete;of the past half-century. Cherry got access to all of the most important people in Wilt Chamberlain's life, and he recounted the incredible accomplishments of the player and also the tortured psyche of the man. Cherry sugarcoats nothing, and he explores every facet of Wilt's life, including a whole chapter on the 20,000 women Wilt supposedly slept with and the never-before-told final days of Chamberlain's life. This book has my highest recommendation."

Reception
Booklist has been appreciative of the book. It calls it "a solid biography for any sports collection", "addresses the misconception [that Chamberlain was perennially called a loser]", and "also gives enough, but not too much, attention to Chamberlain's ill-considered, though possibly accurate, boast that he'd slept with some 20,000 women."

References

2004 non-fiction books
Basketball books
American biographies
Wilt Chamberlain